Waldspurger is a surname. Notable people with this name include:
Carl A. Waldspurger, computer scientist, 1996 winner of ACM Doctoral Dissertation Award
Irène Waldspurger, French mathematician
Jean-Loup Waldspurger (born 1953), French mathematician

See also
Waldspurger formula and Waldspurger's theorem, named after Jean-Loup Waldspurger